This is an index of various lists of mayors of Canadian municipalities.

Largest municipalities

By city

B
 Barrie (Ontario)
 Bedford (Nova Scotia)
 Brampton (Ontario)
 Brandon (Manitoba)
 Brantford (Ontario)
 Burlington (Ontario)

C
 Caledon (Ontario)
 Calgary (Alberta)
 Cambridge (Ontario)
 Cape Breton Regional Municipality (Nova Scotia)
 Charlottetown (Prince Edward Island)
 Clarington (Ontario)

D
 Dartmouth (Nova Scotia)
 Drummondville (Quebec)

E
 East York (Ontario)
 Edmonton (Alberta)
 Etobicoke (Ontario)

F
 Fort Frances (Ontario)
 Fort Saskatchewan (Alberta)
 Fredericton (New Brunswick)

G
 Gander (Newfoundland and Labrador)
 Gatineau (Quebec)
 Guelph (Ontario)

H
 Halifax (Nova Scotia)
 Halifax Regional Municipality (Nova Scotia)
 Hamilton (Ontario)
 Houston (British Columbia)

K
 Kenora (Ontario)
 Kingston (Ontario)
 Kitchener (Ontario)

L
 Langley City (British Columbia)
 Langley District Municipality (British Columbia)
 Lethbridge (Alberta)
 Lévis (Quebec)
 London (Ontario)
 Longueuil (Quebec)
 Lunenburg (Nova Scotia)

M
 Markham (Ontario)
 Medicine Hat (Alberta)
 Mississauga (Ontario)
 Moncton (New Brunswick)
 Montreal (Quebec)
 Moose Jaw (Saskatchewan)

N
 Newmarket (Ontario)
 Niagara Falls (Ontario)
 North Bay (Ontario)

O
 Oakville (Ontario)
 Oshawa (Ontario)
 Ottawa (Ontario)

P
 Penticton (British Columbia)
 Peterborough (Ontario)
 Pickering (Ontario)

Q
 Qualicum Beach (British Columbia)
 Quebec City (Quebec)

R
 Red Deer (Alberta)
 Regina (Saskatchewan)

S
 St. Albert (Alberta)
 St. Catharines (Ontario)
 Saint John (New Brunswick)
 St. John's (Newfoundland and Labrador)
 Saint-Sauveur (Quebec)
 St. Thomas (Ontario)
 Saskatoon (Saskatchewan)
 Sault Ste. Marie (Ontario)
 Scarborough (Ontario)
 Shawinigan (Quebec)
 Sherbrooke (Quebec)
 Strathcona (Alberta, former)
 Sudbury (Ontario)
 Surrey (British Columbia)

T
 Thunder Bay (Ontario)
 Timmins (Ontario)
 Toronto (Ontario)
 Trois-Rivières (Quebec)

V
 Vancouver (British Columbia)
 Victoria (British Columbia)

W
 Waterloo (Ontario)
 Welland (Ontario)
 Whitchurch–Stouffville (Ontario)
 Whitehorse (Yukon)
 White Rock (British Columbia)
 Windsor (Ontario)
 Winnipeg (Manitoba)
 Woodstock (New Brunswick)

Y
 Yellowknife (Northwest Territories)